Russia (minor planet designation: 232 Russia) is a large Main belt asteroid. It is classified as a C-type asteroid and is probably composed of primitive carbonaceous material. It was discovered by Johann Palisa on 31 January 1883 in Vienna, who named it after the country of Russia.

Photometric observations of this asteroid collected during 2007 show a rotation period of 21.8 ± 0.2 hours with a brightness variation of 0.2 ± 0.02 magnitude. A follow up study during 2014 discovered that the rotation period varied depending on the phase angle of observation. The measured rotation varied from 22.016 ± 0.004 hours at a phase angle of 21.5 degrees to 17.0, to 21.904 ±
0.002 hours at phase angles between 5.2 degrees and 9.6 degrees. The reason for this variation has to do with the shape of the asteroid.

References

External links
 The Asteroid Orbital Elements Database
 Minor Planet Discovery Circumstances
 
 

Background asteroids
Russia
Russia
C-type asteroids (Tholen)
18830131